The James H. Doolittle Award is an honor presented annually by the Society of Experimental Test Pilots. It is an award for "outstanding accomplishment in technical management or engineering achievement in aerospace technology". The award consists of a perpetual trophy on permanent display at SETP headquarters, and a smaller replica presented to the recipient. It is named after General James Doolittle, famous for the Doolittle Raid on Tokyo during World War II.

The Doolittle Trophy is a bronze form melding an aerodynamic shape, a stylized spacecraft, and a winged human figure. The aerodynamic shape stands for the scientists and engineers who provide technological breakthroughs. The spacecraft represents continued growth of the  aerospace industry. The human figure represents the pilot who guides the test effort to reach its goals. A helmet and goggles rest on the base of the trophy symbolizing the tools of the early test pilot and Jimmy Doolittle himself. Plaques bearing the name of each honoree are mounted around the sides of the teak base.

Criteria 
The Society lists three criteria for nominations to this award:
The recipient must be a living member of the Society
A significant phase of the accomplishment must have occurred while a member of the Society
The accomplishment must clearly be in the technical management or engineering aspects of aerospace technology

Recipients
Recipients of the SETP J. H. Doolittle Award include:
1966 - James L. Pearce 
1967 - Richard W. Taylor
1968 - William Paul Thayer
1969 - Guy M. Townsend, BGen., USAF (Ret)
1970 - William M. Magruder
1971 - C. H. Meyer
1972 - Donald K. Slayton, NASA/MSC
1973 - William S. Ross, McDonnell Aircraft Company
1974 - William R. Murray
1975 - Robert A. Rushworth, Major General, USAF
1976 - Frank Borman
1977 - Robert C. Little
1978 - William R. Laidlaw
1979 - Thomas P. Stafford, LGen., USAF
1980 - J. Lynn Helms
1981 - Thomas B. Hayward, Admiral, USN
1982 - Allen E. Paulson
1983 - Herbert Z. Hopkins
1984 - Donald D. Engen, VAdm, USN (Ret)
1985 - Olle Klinker
1986 - Hon. John E. Krings
1987 - Burt Rutan, Scaled Composites
1988 - Richard H. Truly, Rear Admiral, USN
1989 - Irving L. Burrows
1990 - Robert P. Harper
1991 - Gordon E. Fornell, LGen., USAF
1992 - William C. Bowes, Vadm., USN and Peter W. Odgers, MGen, USAF (Ret) 
1993 - A. W. "Tony" LeVier
1994 - Per E. Pellebergs
1995 - Stephan A. Hanvey
1996 - Sean C. Roberts, National Test Pilot School
1997 - Frank D. Robinson
1998 - J. Kenneth Higgins
1999 - Pete Reynolds
2000 - Sir Charles Masefield
2001 - Joseph Wendell Dyer, Jr., Vice Admiral (USN) / NASA / iRobot
2002 - Phil Schultz
2003 – Rogers E. Smith, EADS
2004 – Burt Rutan
2005 - Robert C. Ettinger, Northrop Grumman Unmanned Systems
2006 - Terry E. Tomeny, Eclipse Aviation
2007 - Robert L. Crippen
2008 - M. Lynn Hanks, Army Technical Test Center
2009 - Louis H. Knotts, Calspan Corporation
2010 - Dennis P. O'Donoghue, The Boeing Company 
2011 - Joseph E. Sweeney, Lockheed Martin
2012 - Doug Shane, Scaled Composites
2013 - Charles T. Burbage, Lockheed Martin
2014 - George E. Cooper, Charter Member
2015 - Harold R. Gaston, Gulfstream Aerospace
2016 - Jeffrey A. Wieringa, The Boeing Company
2017 - William Gray, U.S. Air Force Test Pilot School
2018 - Mike Carriker, The Boeing Company
2019 - Douglas A. Benjamin, The Boeing Company (Ret)
2020 - Dr. Allen L. Peterson, National Test Pilot School
2021 - Bruce Remick, Federal Aviation Administration (Ret)
2022 - Robert D. Cabana, NASA

See also

 List of aviation awards

References

Aviation awards